César Alejandro Falletti dos Santos (born 2 December 1992) is a Uruguayan professional footballer who plays as a midfielder for Italian Serie B club Ternana.

Club career
He started his career with the C.A. Cerro.

In August 2013 he passed to the Italian Serie B side Ternana alongside his fellow countryman Felipe Avenatti.

He remained in Terni for 4 years, and after the difficulties of the first two-season, he gave his best performance in the last 2; the third one with the Umbrian side in 2015–16 where he scored 10 goals.

On 23 July 2017 he passed to the Serie A side Bologna and once again with Avenatti. His scored his first goal on 24 February 2018 in a 2–0 home win against Genoa. He didn't play a lot also because of injuries.

On 13 August 2018 he went on loan to Palermo, so he went back to a Serie B team.

On 27 August 2019, he passed to the Mexican professional Liga MX club Tijuana.

On 14 September 2020 he signed a 4-year contract with Ternana, the first two seasons of the contract are a loan from Bologna with an obligation from Ternana to purchase his rights in 2022.

Personal life
Falletti is of Italian descent and he holds Italian citizenship.

Career statistics

References

External links
 

1992 births
Living people
Association football midfielders
Uruguayan footballers
Citizens of Italy through descent
Uruguayan sportspeople of Italian descent
C.A. Cerro players
Ternana Calcio players
Bologna F.C. 1909 players
Club Tijuana footballers
Uruguayan Primera División players
Serie A players
Serie B players
Serie C players
Liga MX players
Uruguayan expatriate footballers
Expatriate footballers in Italy
Expatriate footballers in Mexico